Sheridan Township is a township in Cherokee County, Kansas, United States.  As of the 2000 census, its population was 249.

Geography

According to the United States Geological Survey (USGS), it contains eight cemeteries: Bowen, Friendship, Harley, LaRue, McKee, Rigney, Sherman, Star.

The streams of Little Cherry Creek, Mulberry Creek, Plum Creek and Stink Branch all run through the township.

References
 USGS Geographic Names Information System (GNIS)

External links
 City-Data.com

Townships in Cherokee County, Kansas
Townships in Kansas